Tyrol Township is a township in Griggs County, North Dakota, United States.

Demographics
Its population during the 2010 census was 116.

Location within Griggs County
Tyrol Township is located in Township 147 Range 59 west of the Fifth principal meridian.

References

Townships in Griggs County, North Dakota